Richard Cross  is the name of:

Politicians
Richard Cross (died c. 1438), MP for Reading (UK Parliament constituency)
R. A. Cross, 1st Viscount Cross (1823–1914), British statesman and Conservative politician

Others
Richard Cross (actor) (fl. 1700–1724), British stage actor
Richard Cross (actor, died 1760) (fl. 1729–1760), British stage actor, probable son of the above
Richard Cross (bass-baritone) (born 1935), American opera singer
Richard Cross (photojournalist) (1950–1983), American photojournalist 
Richard Alan Cross, English theologian, expert on Duns Scotus
Richard Assheton Cross, 2nd Viscount Cross (1882–1932), British peer and civil servant
Richard E. Cross (1910–1996), American lawyer and executive in the automotive industry
Richard James Cross (1845–1917), English born banker who was prominent in New York society
Richard Cross (Murder One), character portrayed by Stanley Tucci in the TV series Murder One

See also
Dick Cross Wildlife Management Area, protected area in Virginia, United States